IF Finströms Kamraterna (also known as IF Finströmskamraterna and abbreviated IFFK) is a sports and football club in Åland. The football team currently plays in Division III of the Finnish football league.

The home arena lies in Finström, a small countryside municipality on the Åland islands. The team has been the most popular and successful team on the Åland islands decades ago, playing almost regularly at the second level of the Finland's only and amateur Football League.

External links
 Official website

Football in Åland
Football clubs in Finland
1933 establishments in Finland